The 2013 Kerrick Sports Sedan Series was an Australian motor racing series open to Group 3D Sports Sedans and to Class TA Trans Am type cars. It was the tenth annual National Series to be held in Australia for Sports Sedans.

Calendar

The series was contested over five rounds.

Series results

References

National Sports Sedan Series
Sports Sedans